Romeo Weds Heer is a 2018 Pakistani drama serial, directed by Anjum Shahzad, written by Muhammad Younis Butt and produced by 7th Sky Productions. It stars Feroze Khan and Sana Javed in lead roles. The show was originally aired in single episodes on Sunday evenings, but towards the end of its run, it began to run episodes in a mega-episode format because of low ratings (2 episodes aired at once) on Sunday evenings. It premiered on 21 October 2018 on Geo Entertainment. The series ended on 26 May 2019.

Plot
The drama is a rom-com between Feroze Khan who plays Romeo, son of successful and rich doctors. and Sana Javed as Heer, the daughter of a herbal-medication health practitioner (called as hakim amongst Muslim community in Indian subcontinent) and a regular housewife; two college sweethearts who fight totally different family backgrounds and finally manage to get married against all odds.

Cast
Feroze Khan as Romeo Raja
Sana Javed as Heer Luqman/Heer Romeo Raja
Saman Ansari as Dr. Shahnaz Raja, Romeo’s mother
Zia Gorchani as Dr. Shahbaz Raja, Romeo’s father
Zohreh Ali as Manaal, Romeo’s sister
Fareeda Shabbir as Rolly, Romeo's aunt
Tara Mahmood as Irshad, Heer’s mother
Firdous Jamal as Hakeem Luqman, Heer’s father
Mariam Ansari as Soni, Heer’s sister
Beena Chaudhary as JD's mother
Ali Rizvi as Aflatoon, Heer’s brother
Shafaat Ali as Nazar, Heer’s brother-in-law 
Ali Safina as Jaidi, Heer’s ex-fiancé
Farhan Alam as Chashmatu, Heer’s friend
Rayyan Ibrahim as Bubble, Heer’s friend
Namrah Shahid as Shanzey, Romeo’s friend
Waqar as Elephant, Romeo’s best friend

Production
Feroze Khan shared his new look from his next play named Romeo Weds Heer on Instagram. He further informed his fans that this would be a Rom-com and would also be directed by Anjum Shahzad. It marks the third collaboration of Feroze with director Anjum Shahzad after the romantic films Zindagi Kitni Haseen Hai and Saga of Love and Revenge Khaani. Anjum, once again, selected Sana Javed as the female lead after her mind blowing performance in Khaani, thus the trio returned. Besides this, the leading couple has also been a part of Mehreen Jabbars Dino Ki Dulhaniya, a television film, thus this marks the third appearance of Feroze and Sana as a couple.

Romeo Weds Heer is written by Muhammad Younis Butt. It is produced under the banner of 7th Sky Entertainment.

Reception 
The show impressed with super high ratings in its first episodes; reaching 4-1 TRPs. It kept a lead for many weeks, and if it was not number 1 it was still in top 10. However towards February the TRP began falling down and had a terrible audience reception, and was no longer in the top 10. It was only getting 0-5 TRPs. By the last episode, the show lost a lot of fanbase; both on TV, and YouTube.

Awards and nominations

Soundtrack

The title song was sung by Sahir Ali Bagga & Aima Baig and has more than 21.70 million views on YouTube. Sahir Ali Bagga also composed the music.

Track listing

References

External links

Geo TV original programming
Urdu-language television shows
Pakistani drama television series
2018 Pakistani television series debuts